Joel Edward Horlen (August 14, 1937 – April 10, 2022) was an American professional baseball pitcher. He played in Major League Baseball (MLB) from 1961 to 1972 for the Chicago White Sox and Oakland Athletics. In references, he is called Joe Horlen or Joel Horlen with roughly equal frequency.

From 1964 to 1968, Horlen led all American League pitchers with a 2.32 ERA. In his career, Horlen won 116 games against 117 losses, with a 3.11 earned run average and 1,065 strikeouts in 2,002 innings pitched.

He was the only baseball player to play for teams that won a Pony League World Series (1952), a College World Series (Oklahoma State, 1959), and a Major League World Series (Oakland, 1972).

Early life
Horlen was born in San Antonio, Texas.  He attended Luther Burbank High School, in San Antonio.  Horlen was a convert to Judaism.

Horlen attended Oklahoma State University and played college baseball for the Oklahoma State Cowboys. He was named to the American Baseball Coaches Association All-America second team, as he helped lead Oklahoma State to the 1959 College World Series.

Minor league career
Horlen was signed by the Chicago White Sox in 1959. That year he pitched for the Lincoln Chiefs. The next season he pitched in Class A for the Charleston White Sox, and had a 7–5 win–loss record with a 2.93 earned run average (ERA). He began 1961 pitching for the AAA San Diego Padres, for whom he was 12–9 with a 2.51 ERA.

Major league career

Chicago White Sox (1961–1971)

Horlen made his Major League debut against the Minnesota Twins in the second game of a September 4, 1961 doubleheader. He won the game in relief while wearing a numberless uniform, as the only available road uniform did not have a number. Horlen pitched as a spot starter in his first two full seasons with the White Sox. In 1963, he returned to the minors to pitch four games for the AAA Indianapolis Indians, going 3–0 with a 1.74 ERA.

In 1964 he earned a spot in the starting rotation, posting a 13–9 record and setting career bests in earned run average (1.88; second in the American League only to Dean Chance's 1.65) and strikeouts (138).  He also led the majors by allowing only 6.07 hits per nine innings, bettering Sandy Koufax's National League-leading 6.22. In the next 42 years, only eight right-handed pitchers bettered that ratio in a season. He also led the AL in Walks + Hits per IP (WHIP) (.935). That year his White Sox battled the New York Yankees and Baltimore Orioles for the pennant, but finished second, one game behind the Yankees and one game ahead of the Orioles.

In 1965, Horlen was second in the league in shutouts (four), and was third in walks/9 IP (1.60). In 1966, he led the league in wild pitches (14), was sixth in hit batsmen (six), and was second in ERA (2.43).

Horlen finished the 1967 season with a 19–7 record and led American League pitchers with a 2.06 ERA and six shutouts, was second in W-L percentage (.731), fourth in wins, complete games (13), and walks/9 IP (2.02), and 7th in innings pitched (258).  He also led the AL in walks plus hits per inning pitched (WHIP) (.953). He was named to the American League All-Star team for the only time in his career, but did not pitch in the game. On September 10, Horlen threw a no-hitter as the White Sox were involved in a four-way pennant race with the Twins, Boston Red Sox, and Detroit Tigers. Horlen recorded victories in his next three starts, including one five days later against the Twins. However, on September 27, which would be known by fans as "Black Wednesday", the lowly Kansas City Athletics swept a doubleheader from the White Sox and effectively eliminated Eddie Stanky's "Hitless Wonders" (the White Sox led the Majors with a 2.45 earned run average but also posted a .225 batting average, with no regular batting above .250) from pennant contention. Horlen lost the second game, as 21-year-old Catfish Hunter shut out the White Sox 4–0. The two games were the last played by the Athletics in Kansas City before the team moved to Oakland for the start of the 1968 season. The White Sox finished fourth, three games behind the Red Sox who, after finishing next to last in 1966, won the pennant on the final day, finishing one game ahead of the Twins and Tigers. Horlen finished runner-up to Jim Lonborg, the star of the Red Sox staff, in the American League Cy Young Award balloting, and fourth in MVP voting, won by Boston's Carl Yastrzemski.

In 1968 Horlen led the AL in hit batsmen (14). In 1970 he was fifth in walks/9 IP (2.14). In spring training of 1972, the White Sox released Horlen.

Oakland Athletics (1972)

Horlen later signed with Oakland, and pitched mostly in relief as the Athletics won the 1972 World Series.

After the major leagues
In 1973 he pitched for the AA San Antonio Brewers, going 6–1 with a 2.87 ERA. In 1989, Horlen played for the St. Lucie Legends of the Senior Professional Baseball Association. In 2004, he was inducted into the San Antonio Sports Hall of Fame.

In 2017, it was announced that he had Alzheimer's disease. He died on April 10, 2022, at the age of 84.

See also
 List of Major League Baseball annual ERA leaders
 List of Major League Baseball no-hitters
List of select Jewish baseball players

References

External links

Horlen's "Jews in Sports" profile
Boxscore of Horlen's 1967 no-hitter
Oral History Interview with Joel Horlen, Oklahoma Oral History Research Program at the OSU Library

1937 births
2022 deaths
American League All-Stars
American League ERA champions
Baseball players from San Antonio
Charleston White Sox players
Chicago White Sox players
Converts to Judaism
Indianapolis Indians players
Jewish American baseball players
Jewish Major League Baseball players
Lincoln Chiefs players
Major League Baseball pitchers
Oakland Athletics players
Oklahoma State Cowboys baseball players
San Antonio Brewers players
San Diego Padres (minor league) players
St. Lucie Legends players
21st-century American Jews